Baozang is a town in Jiangcheng Hani and Yi Autonomous County, Yunnan, China.

Administrative division
As of 2016, the town is divided into six villages: 
 Shuicheng
 Liangmahe
 Banhe
 Haiming
 Qianjin
 Longma

History
On December 28, 2012, it was upgraded to a town.

Geography
The town sits at the southwestern Jiangcheng Hani and Yi Autonomous County. It borders Mojiang Hani Autonomous County in the north, GuoqingTownship and Menglie Town in the east, Kangping Town in the south, and Ning'er Hani and Yi Autonomous County in the west.

The Mengye River and Nankeng River flow through the town.

Economy
The economy of the province is mainly based on agriculture and animal husbandry. Tea, sugarcane and natural rubber are the economic crops in the region.

Demographics

As of 2017, the National Bureau of Statistics of China estimates the town's population now to be 11,000.

References

Bibliography

Divisions of Jiangcheng Hani and Yi Autonomous County